A reinforced concrete column  is a structural member designed to carry compressive loads, composed of concrete with an embedded steel frame to provide reinforcement.  For design purposes, the columns are separated into two categories: short columns and slender columns.

Short columns
The strength of short columns is controlled by the strength of the material and the geometry of the cross section.  Reinforcing rebar is placed axially in the column to provide additional axial stiffness.  Accounting for the additional stiffness of the steel, the nominal loading capacity Pn for the column in terms of the maximum compressive stress of the concrete fc', the yield stress of the steel  fy, the gross cross section area of the column Ag, and the total cross section area of the steel rebar Ast
 
where the first term represents the load carried by the concrete and the second term represents the load carried by the steel.  Because the yield strength of steel is an order of magnitude larger than that of concrete, a small addition of steel will greatly increase the strength of the column.

Design load
To give a conservative estimate and build redundancies into the final structural system, the ACI Building Code Requirements give a maximum reduced design load of   where  is the strength reduction factor for the type of column used.  For spiral columns
 
where .  For tied columns
 
where .
The additional reduction past the strength reduction factor is to account for any eccentricities in the loading of column.  Distributing a load toward one end of the column will produce a moment in the column and prevent the entire cross section from carrying the load, thus producing high stress concentrations towards that end of the column.

Spiral columns
Spiral columns are cylindrical columns with a continuous helical bar wrapping around the column.  The spiral acts to provide support in the transverse direction and prevent the column from barreling. The amount of reinforcement is required to provide additional load-carrying capacity greater than or equal to that attributed from the shell as to compensate for the strength lost when the shell spalls off.  With further thickening of the spiral rebar, the axially loaded concrete becomes the weakest link in the system and the strength contribution from the additional rebar does not take effect until the column has failed axially.  At that point, the additional strength from spiral reinforcement engages and prevents catastrophic failure, instead giving rise to a much slower ductile failure.

The ACI Building Code Requirements put the following restrictions on amount of spiral reinforcement.

ACI Code 7.10.4.2:  For cast-in-place construction, size of spirals shall not be less than 3/8 in. diameter.

ACI Code 7.10.4.3:  Clear spacing between spirals shall not exceed 3 in., nor be less than 1in.

Section 10.9.3 adds an additional lower limit to the amount of spiral reinforcement via the volumetric spiral reinforcement ratio ρs.

where Ach is the shell area, the cross-sectional area measured to the outside edges of transverse reinforcement.
P = f/A

Tied columns
Tied columns have closed lateral ties spaced approximately uniformly across the column.  The spacing of the ties is limited in that they must be close enough to prevent barreling failure between them, and far enough apart that they do not interfere with the setting of the concrete.  The ACI codebook puts an upward limit on the spacing between ties.

ACI Code 7.10.5:  Vertical spacing of ties shall not exceed 16 longitudinal bar diameters, 48 tie bar or wire diameters, or least dimension of the compression member.

If the ties are spaced too far apart, the column will experience shearfailure and barrel in between the ties.

Slender columns

Columns qualify as being slender when their cross sectional area is very small in proportion to their length. Unlike Short Columns, Slender Columns are limited by their geometry and will buckle before the concrete or steel reinforcement yields.

Nonlinear simulation of columns
There are some analytical stress-strain models and damage indices for confined and unconfined concretes to simulate reinforced concrete columns that make possible without any experimental test to evaluate the stress-strain relationship and damage of confined and unconfined concretes situated inside and outside of stirrups. To see such models and simulations of columns subjected to the cyclic and monotonic loading, refer to the following links:,

References

External links

Columns and entablature
Concrete buildings and structures
Reinforced concrete
Structural system